Catherine L. "Cathy" Stepp ( O'Donnell; born August 17, 1963) is an American government administrator and former Republican politician.  She is the city administrator of Branson, Missouri, and previously served as regional administrator (midwest) of the U.S. Environmental Protection Agency under President Donald Trump.  Earlier, she was secretary of the Wisconsin Department of Natural Resources in the cabinet of governor Scott Walker, and served four years in the Wisconsin State Senate, representing Racine County.

Biography
Stepp was born in Kenosha, Wisconsin, and graduated from Oak Creek High School in Oak Creek, Wisconsin, in 1981.  After marrying, she joined the home-building firm of her husband, known as First Stepp Builders, in Racine, Wisconsin, and became co-owner of the company.  Through the business community, she rose in prominence in local affairs, and in 2000 she was appointed by Governor Tommy Thompson to the state's Natural Resources Board, which oversees the Wisconsin Department of Natural Resources.

In 2002, Stepp successfully challenged Democratic Senator Kimberly Plache for Plache's Racine County-based State Senate seat. From 2003 until 2007, Stepp served as a Republican in the Wisconsin State Senate, representing the 21st Senate district.  Stepp was only the second Republican to win an election in the Racine County Senate district in the previous 50 years.  She announced in 2005 that she would not run for re-election in 2006, saying she wanted to devote more time to her family.  She was succeeded by Democrat John Lehman.

In January 2011, Governor Scott Walker appointed Stepp to be his Secretary of the Wisconsin Department of Natural Resources (DNR). During her tenure, Stepp rolled back environmental oversight and regulation.

In August 2017, it was announced that Stepp would be resigning to become a deputy administrator of the U.S. Environmental Protection Agency. Stepp supported Trump at rallies in Wisconsin, and has questioned the existence of climate change.

Stepp resigned from the EPA in January 2020, and moved to Missouri, where she worked for a clean water non-profit and an ecological restoration company.  She was hired as city administrator of Branson, Missouri, in 2022.

Electoral history

Wisconsin Senate (2002)

| colspan="6" style="text-align:center;background-color: #e9e9e9;"| Republican Primary, September 10, 2002

| colspan="6" style="text-align:center;background-color: #e9e9e9;"| General Election, November 5, 2002

References

External links
 Official page (City of Branson)

1963 births
Living people
Politicians from Kenosha, Wisconsin
People from Branson, Missouri
Republican Party Wisconsin state senators
Women state legislators in Wisconsin
Businesspeople from Wisconsin
State cabinet secretaries of Wisconsin
21st-century American politicians
21st-century American women politicians
Trump administration personnel